This article is about the list of Grupo Desportivo Sagrada Esperança players. G.D. Sagrada Esperança is an Angolan football (soccer) club based in Dundo, Lunda Norte, Angola and plays at Estádio Sagrada Esperança.  The club was established in 1976.

2020–2021
G.D. Sagrada Esperança players 2020–2021

2011–2020
G.D. Sagrada Esperança players 2011–2020

2001–2010
G.D. Sagrada Esperança players 2001–2010

1991–2000
G.D. Sagrada Esperança players 1991–2000

1980–1989
G.D. Sagrada Esperança players 1980–1989

External links
 Girabola.com profile
 Zerozero.pt profile
 Match details
 Facebook profile
 Facebook profile 2

References

Sagrada Esperança
G.D. Sagrada Esperança players
Association football player non-biographical articles